Carlos Alberto Higuera de los Ríos (born 18 November 2000) is a Mexican professional footballer who plays as a goalkeeper for Liga MX club Querétaro, on loan from Tijuana.

International career
In April 2019, Higuera was included in the 21-player squad to represent Mexico at the U-20 World Cup in Poland.

Career statistics

Club

References

External links
 
 
 Carlos Higuera at FM DataBase Stats
 

2000 births
Living people
Club Tijuana footballers
Liga MX players
Mexican footballers
Association football goalkeepers
Footballers from Sinaloa
People from Ahome Municipality
Mexico under-20 international footballers